SAO North-East Bosnia ( / SAO Severoistočna Bosna) was a Serb Autonomous Region ( / SAO), a Serb break-away province, in the Yugoslav republic of Bosnia and Herzegovina (SR BiH). It was established in September 1991, proclaimed by the Serb Democratic Party on 19 September, along with other SAOs (Eastern Herzegovina, Bosanska Krajina, Romanija), and included five districts in northeastern SR BiH. It existed between September 1991 and 9 January 1992, when it became part of Republic of the Serb people of Bosnia and Herzegovina (later Republika Srpska). It was renamed SAO Semberija in November 1991, and SAO Semberija and Majevica (САО Семберија и Мајевица) in December 1991. It included three municipalities (Bijeljina, Lopare and Ugljevik), with a population of 150,000, out of whom 56–59% were ethnic Serbs. The capital was Bijeljina.

References

Sources

External links
 Map

States and territories disestablished in 1992
States and territories established in 1991
History of Republika Srpska
Separatism in Bosnia and Herzegovina